Outline or outlining may refer to:

 Outline (list), a document summary, in hierarchical list format
 Code folding, a method of hiding or collapsing code or text to see content in outline form
 Outline drawing, a sketch depicting the outer edges of a person or object, without interior details or shading
 Outline (note-taking software), a note-taking application
 Outline typeface, in typography
 Outline VPN, a free and open-source Shadowsocks deployment tool
 Outline, the representation of a word in shorthand
 Step outline, or just outline, the first summary of a story for a film script

Media
 Outline (novel), a 2014 novel by Rachel Cusk
 Outlines (collection), a 1939 collection of poems by surrealist poet Jean Venturini
 The Outline (website), a news company
 Outlines Festival, an annual one-day music festival held in Sheffield, United Kingdom
 Outline Records, record label founded by Jane Ira Bloom
 The Outline (band), an experimental band from the United States
 "Outlines" (song), a 2014 song by Mike Mago and Dragonette

See also
 Outliner, a software application for creating outlines
 Contour (disambiguation)
 Lining out
 Silhouette, an art form emphasizing the outline of the subject of the art

ru:Контур